is a former Japanese international table tennis player.

Table tennis career
He won five medals in doubles, and team events in the World Table Tennis Championships.

The five World Championship medals included two gold medals in the team event for Japan.

The other three medals consisted of all bronze medals won in the doubles with Toshiaki Tanaka and Toshihiko Miyata respectively and the mixed doubles with Taeko Namba.

He also won an English Open title.

See also
 List of table tennis players
 List of World Table Tennis Championships medalists

References

Japanese male table tennis players
1933 births
Living people
Asian Games medalists in table tennis
Table tennis players at the 1958 Asian Games
Asian Games silver medalists for Japan
Asian Games bronze medalists for Japan
Medalists at the 1958 Asian Games
World Table Tennis Championships medalists